Gaoqiao Township is a rural township in Taojiang County, Hunan Province, People's Republic of China.

Administrative division
The township is divided into 12 villages, the following areas: Hengmatang Village, Shitouping Village, Shijingtou Village, Zhaojiashan Village, Songbai Village, Longtanqiao Village, Luoxi Village, Gaoqiao Village, Heyetang Village, Xiaoshanwan Village, Qianqiu Village, and Dalin Village (横马塘村、石头坪村、石井头村、赵家山村、松柏村、龙潭桥村、罗溪村、高桥村、荷叶塘村、小山湾村、千秋村、大林村).

References

External links

Divisions of Taojiang County